Boa is a Russian band founded in 1988 by Igor Knyazev and his cousin Sergei Serin. 
Boa's musical style, a blend of jazz, easy listening and Latino, has been influenced by elements of ethno-fusion and worldbeat. It explains the choice of the name Boa: a short name, with the same meaning in many languages, quite exotic in Russia and advocating something tropical.

Boa's performance credo is to combine bright, distinct melodies and unusual harmonies with ironic and smart lyrics. The current nucleus of the group is Igor Knyazev (main and background vocals, music, and lyrics) and Igor Shatsky (music, lyrics, arrangement, guitar, piano, percussion). In addition, from time to time Boa hires session musicians to diversify its repertoire.

All of Boa recordings are done by Shatsky and Knyazev, who are professional sound producers, at one of the best sound recording studio in Central Russia, The Black Box Studio in Voronezh.

Discography 
 1996: Cafe Chantant (Кафешантан)
 2003: Grown-up Boys Do Not Pee Their Pants (Взрослые мальчики в штаны не писают)

References

Musical groups established in 1988
Russian musical groups